Docs in Progress is a film organization based in the Washington, D.C., area which showcases and incubates works in progress by up-and-coming and established documentary filmmakers.

History 

Docs in Progress is a 501(c)(3) non-profit arts organization located in downtown Silver Spring, Maryland, where workshops, classes, screenings, consultations and networking events are held. It was founded in 2004 as a small-scale series of screenings of works-in-progress by Washington DC-area independent documentary filmmakers first at the Warehouse Theater and later at the George Washington University in partnership with The Documentary Center. Its signature program is focused on screening two unfinished documentaries at every workshop.  Following each screening, the audience participates in an interactive feedback session with the filmmaker(s).  Films have been shown by everyone from students to well-established documentary filmmakers.  Workshops are open to the general public so that filmmakers can get feedback from the kind of audiences they are trying to reach.

In addition to its screenings, Docs In Progress also provides classes, workshops, fellowships, fiscal sponsorship, and other programs intended for emerging documentary filmmakers, particularly in the Washington, D.C., area.  It also holds an annual film festival called Community Stories which spotlights people and places in Montgomery County, Maryland.

References 
 So you wanna be a film critic?, Washington Post, November 11, 2005
 , Documentary Magazine, June/July 2006
 The Doc Blogs: Part of a Thriving Online Film Community, indieWIRE, March 2007
 Interview on WAMU Radio Metro Connection
 Documentary Filmmakers' Lifeline The Silver Spring Voice, June 2012 
 Community Minute: Using Filmmaking As a Tool for Social Change, WAMU Radio, June 2012
 A Decade of Docs DC Kojo Nnamdi Show, October 2014

External links
 Docs in Progress Official Site 
 Docs Interactive Blog

Film organizations in the United States